α,α,α',α'-Tetrabromo-o-xylene is an organobromine compound with the formula C6H4(CHBr2)2.  Three isomers of α,α,α',α'-Tetrabromoxylene exist, but the ortho derivative is most widely studied.  It is an off-white solid.  The compound is prepared by the photochemical reaction of o-xylene with elemental bromine:

Reaction of α,α,α',α'-tetrabromo-o-xylene with sodium iodide affords α,α'-dibromo-o-xylylene, which can be trapped with dienophiles to give naphthylene. In the absence of trapping agents, the xylylene relaxes to α,α'-dibromobenzocyclobutane:

Cycloadditions of these xylylenes provides a pathway to acenes.

References

Organobromides